Dunollie is a small town on the West Coast of the South Island of New Zealand, approximately 8 km from Greymouth. It is at an elevation of approximately 30 meters.

Dunollie  was a station on the Rewanui line railway. Coal deposits were discovered in the Paparoa Ranges.

Cretaceous–Paleogene (K–Pg) extinction event

The Cretaceous–Paleogene (K–Pg) extinction event,also known as the Cretaceous–Tertiary (K–T) extinction, was a sudden mass extinction of three-quarters of the plant and animal species on Earth approximately 66 million years ago.

Some 2 kilometers up the valley near the river bed and near the Moody Creek mine, a layer of rock was found where the formation of coal had abruptly ended some 66 million years ago. The top of the coal was coated with a thin layer of Iriduim and then there occurred a 40,000 year Fern Spike. This formation was key in proving the size, severity and the global nature of the Chixulub Impactor. The K–Pg extinction event was severe, global, rapid, and selective, eliminating a vast number of species. Based on marine fossils, it is estimated that 75% or more of all species were made extinct.

References

Populated places in the West Coast, New Zealand